"After School Special" is the 10th episode of The Vampire Diaries's fourth season, premiering January 17, 2013, on The CW.

Plot
Following Carol's death, Bonnie's father steps in as the new mayor and show concern about Bonnie. Meanwhile, Rebekah and April work together to get Elena to speak to Rebekah, trapping Elena in the library. Stefan is called to rescue Elena, and he calls Caroline for back up. Both are tricked and locked into the library with Elena, although Rebekah allows April to leave. Meanwhile, Matt and Damon continue training Jeremy to expand the hunter's mark. Klaus gets impatient and Damon shoots him several times for killing Carol. Regardless, Klaus offers to provide vampires for Jeremy to kill starting with a pizza delivery woman; she attacks them, forcing Jeremy to kill her. Bonnie talks to Shane, who gives her an amulet made from human bone. Kol soon shows up and abducts Shane, taking him to the school's library. Rebekah talks to them about the cure and more personally, to Elena about her break up with Stefan and her feelings for Damon, in an effort to torment Stefan. Tyler gets a call from Rebekah to rescue his friends. Kol brings in Shane and tortures him for the location of the cure. Shane tells Kol and Rebekah about Silas, and how he intends to release him and how Silas will resurrect those who died on his behalf.

Rebekah refuses to listen and Kol attempts to drown Shane and impales him, but Bonnie manages to put a protection spell on Shane; but April suffers from the spell due to a link between her and Shane. Tyler arrives and Rebekah compels him to turn into a werewolf. As Tyler begins to transform, he tells his friends to run for it. As they do, Stefan finds an unconscious April with Bonnie and manages to revive her, telling Bonnie to get her out. When Tyler turns back to his human form, Caroline finds him and he reveals that he blames himself for everything. Rebekah walks up to Elena and Stefan and offers to erase Stefan's memories of Elena, but when he accepts, Rebekah goes back on her word; saying that Stefan's pain is her own revenge.

At the end of the episode, April talks to the sheriff and the mayor, revealing that she knows about the supernatural and everyone's lies. Damon and Elena talk on the phone and Elena says that sire bond or not, she loves him. Damon tells her to meet him at the cabin. Rebekah comes to Stefan saying that she still wants the cure so she can use it on Klaus, and Stefan agrees to help her. Klaus calls Jeremy, Matt and Damon to a bar, full of people transforming into vampires.

Reception

Ratings 
When the episode aired on January 17, 2013, the episode was viewed by 2.95 million American viewers.

References

External links 
Recap from Official Website

2013 American television episodes
The Vampire Diaries (season 4) episodes